Maigué Abbas (born 24 July 1989) is a Chadian football defender, who plays for Chadian side Gazelle.

Career 

Maigué Abbas started his career in Renaissance. After RFC, he played for Elect-Sport. Maigue played for Elect in two occasions: first time from 2007-2009 and the second time in 2011 and 2012. After Elect, he played for Gazelle.

International career 

Maigue is a member of Chad national football team where he plays centre-back position. He has 4 caps for national team so far and was a part of qualifying campaign for 2012 Africa Cup of Nations. He made a debut in a match against Tunisia on 11 August 2010.

See also 
 List of Chad international footballers

References

External links 

1989 births
Living people
Chadian footballers
People from N'Djamena
Chad international footballers
Gazelle FC players

Association football defenders